Omukama Kamurasi Kyebambi IV (1822–1869) was the 22nd Omukama of Bunyoro from 1852 to his death in 1869.

Bunyoro
Ugandan monarchies
1822 births
1869 deaths